Anna Gushchina (born 5 May 1997) is a Russian judoka.

She won a medal at the 2019 World Judo Championships.

References

External links
 

1997 births
Living people
Russian female judoka
Universiade medalists in judo
Universiade silver medalists for Russia
Universiade bronze medalists for Russia
Medalists at the 2019 Summer Universiade
21st-century Russian women